Keith Kondo (born 5 November 1988 in Harare, Zimbabwe) is a Zimbabwean cricketer.

Career
Kondo made his List A debut for Mashonaland against Matabeleland in the 2005–06 Inter-Provincial One-Day Competition, scoring seven runs batting at #7. He played three further games for Mashonaland in the 2005–06 season, including a bowling analysis of 3/15 against Midlands.

Kondo made his first-class debut for Northerns in 2008 after the reorganisation of Zimbabwean cricket, making 30 and 8 runs after opening the batting in both innings. He played four further first-class matches for Northerns in the 2007–08 and 2008–09, mainly as an opener, as well as two List A matches.

Kondo represented Southern Rocks in one first-class match against Mountaineers in September 2009 after Zimbabwean cricket was once again reorganised, scoring a duck in the first innings and 11 in the second innings. This remains his last first-class match to date, although he did appear in six matches for Southern Rocks B in the 2009–10 Franchise B League, scoring 301 runs at an average of 33.44, with a highest score of 86.

References

External links
CricketArchive profile
ESPNCricinfo profile

1988 births
Mashonaland cricketers
Northerns (Zimbabwe) cricketers
Sportspeople from Harare
Southern Rocks cricketers
Zimbabwean cricketers
Living people